Macellari is an Italian surname. Notable people with the surname include:

Fabio Macellari (born 1974), Italian footballer
Giordano Macellari (born 1962), Italian artist
Liana Burgess (born Macellari), Italian translator and literary agent

Italian-language surnames